Senator O'Shaughnessy may refer to:

Jerry O'Shaughnessy (1906–1972), Ohio State Senate
Robert O'Shaughnessy (1918–1991), Ohio State Senate